Imperial Noble Consort Wan (1428－1487), born Wan Zhen'er, was an imperial consort during the Ming dynasty. She is sometimes known as Consort Wan or Lady Wan and was the favorite consort of the Chenghua Emperor. She was approximately fifteen to seventeen years older than the emperor.

Biography
Wan Zhen'er's father, Wan Gui, was a county official. During the Xuande period, he was sent to Bazhou in Shuntian Prefecture for breaking the law. Therefore, when Wan Zhen'er was four years old, she was selected to serve as the maid of one of the Xuande Emperor's grandsons of the Ming dynasty. In 1449, Emperor Yingzong of Ming was captured after his army lost the Battle of Tumu Fortress against the Mongols. His capture by the enemy force shook the empire to its core, and the ensuing crisis almost caused the dynasty to collapse had it not been for the capable governing of a prominent minister named Yu Qian. 

In the emperor's absence, Empress Dowager Sun and court officials supported Yingzong’s younger brother Zhu Qiyu's ascension to the throne as the Jingtai Emperor. At the time, Yingzong's two-year-old son Zhu Jianshen was still crown prince. In order to prevent an enemy from being close to Zhu Jianshen, Empress Dowager Sun appointed Wan Zhener to be the prince's personal nanny. In 1452, the Jingtai Emperor revoked his nephew's title of crown prince removed and installed his own son, Zhu Jianji, as heir. Zhu Jianshen was forced into confinement, and became close to Wan Zhener, one of his only companions during this time.

In 1457, Yingzong regained the throne as the Tianshun Emperor, and Zhu Jianshen was reinstated as crown prince. When the emperor learned about Zhu Jianshen and Wan Zhen'ers' relationship, he believed that the older palace maid had seduced the young prince and had her beaten with boards. 

After Zhu Jianshen ascended to the throne as the Chenghua Emperor in 1464, the emperor made Wan his consort and she quickly became his favorite after giving birth to a boy in 1466. As the mother of his son, the emperor regularly gave Consort Wan many presents and awarded her the new title of Imperial Noble Consort. These signs of affection caused a lot of jealousy from other consorts who began spreading rumors about Consort Wan's evil doings. After Wan's son died at age of ten months old, she jealously employed eunuchs to oversee the emperor's harem and report back to her if any concubines became pregnant. For several decades, Lady Wan would use tactics including forced abortions and even murders of members of the harem to eliminate her rivals, resulting in the Chenghua Emperor lamenting that by the age of thirty one that he still lacked a male heir. 

It was only then revealed to the emperor that a male heir, Zhu Youcheng was secretly saved and raised in a secure location outside the palace for five years. After reuniting with the young prince, Zhu Youcheng was granted the title of crown prince and would become the future Hongzhi Emperor, notable for being the only Ming emperor to never take any concubines. 

However, many scholars cast doubt about the forced abortions carried out by Consort Wan. For example Qing emperor Qianlong rejected such stories. Moreover, the Chenghua Emperor actually had many male offsprings which outlived him for a long time.

Lady Wan died in 1487, 8 months before the Chenghua Emperor himself died after 23 years on the throne. He was buried in the Maoling (茂陵) Mausoleum of the Ming tombs. It is said that when knowing the death of Lady Wan, the Chenghua Emperor was unable to speak for an entire day, before stating: "Zhen-er has gone, I will follow soon."

Later, during the reign Hongzhi Emperor, Cao Lin (曹璘) once proposed stripping off the title Imperial Noble Consort of Lady Wan. However the Hongzhi Emperor, due to the respect and fidelity to his father, refused to do so.

Titles 
During the reign of the Xuande Emperor (r. 1425–1435):
Lady Wan (萬氏, from 1428)
Palace Lady (宮女, from 1432)
During the reign of the Zhengtong Emperor (r. 1435–1449) and  Jingtai Emperor (r. 1449–1457):
Nanny (答應, from 1449)
During the reign of the Chenghua Emperor (r. 1464–1487)
Noble Consort (貴妃, after 1461)
Imperial Noble Consort (皇贵妃)
Imperial Noble Consort Gongsu (恭肅皇貴妃, from 1487)

Issue 
As Noble Consort:
 Chenghua Emperor's first son (14 February 1466 – November 1466)

Notes

1428 births
1487 deaths
Ming dynasty imperial consorts
Chinese ladies-in-waiting
People from Zhucheng